Wife Swap Australia is an Australian reality television program based on the British TV format Wife Swap. The show ran for a single season of ten episodes on Lifestyle You from 9 January 2012.

In October 2018, it was announced that the Seven Network would be reviving the format in 2019, however in September 2019, the series was delayed and was intended to air sometime in 2020 but was again pushed back in October 2020 and is set to air 2021. The season began airing on 11 February 2021.

Season 1 (2012)
The original series aired 10 episodes in 2012

Season 2 (2021)

Season 3 (2022)

References

2010s Australian reality television series
2020s Australian reality television series
2012 Australian television series debuts
Australian dating and relationship reality television series
Seven Network original programming
Australian television series revived after cancellation
Australian television series based on British television series
Television series by Screentime